Innamorata may refer to:

 Innamorata (song), a 1955 song
 Innamorata (TV series), a Filipino drama series
 Innamorata (album), an album by Pat Benatar
 Innamorati, stock characters within the theatre style known as Commedia dell'arte

See also
 Inamorata (disambiguation)